Koroghlu fortress is a fortress located in the village of Gala in Gadabay district, Azerbaijan.

History
The name of the fortress is connected to Koroglu, the national hero of Azerbaijan. Fortresses with this name are encountered in Shamkir, Gadabay, Tovuz and other regions. Generally, common features of the Koroghlu fortresses are that they are mostly built in the 17th century and in a strategic military position in high-altitude, inaccessible places. Some researchers state that the age of the monument is older. According to them, the age of these monuments dates back farther than Koroglu, who lived in the 16th–17th centuries.

Location
It is located at an altitude of 2,000 meters above sea level. The fortress is located between the villages of Galakand and Miskinli, on the peak of the rocky cliff. The monument can be climbed only by foot.  The western side of the tower is a steep cliff. The thickness of the walls is about 1 meter. Inside the fortress there are the ruins of windmill, tandoor and water reservoir. According to local residents, there are hidden underground roads that have not yet been explored in the fortress.

See also

 Architecture of Azerbaijan

References

Monuments and memorials in Azerbaijan
Buildings and structures in Azerbaijan
Tourist attractions in Azerbaijan